Eugene L. Tattini (born April 5, 1943) is a retired lieutenant general in the United States Air Force and served as deputy director of the Jet Propulsion Laboratory from July 2001 to September 2013.

Biography
Tattini was born in Madison, Wisconsin. He attended the University of Illinois at Urbana-Champaign, Oklahoma City University, Cornell University, and Harvard University.

Military career
Tattini joined the Air Force in 1965. Later in his career, he was named Director of Plans of Air Force Materiel Command. In 1998, he was given command of the Space and Missile Systems Center. His retirement was effective as of July 1, 2001.

Awards he has received include the Air Force Distinguished Service Medal, the Legion of Merit with oak leaf cluster, the Meritorious Service Medal with three oak leaf clusters, the Air Force Commendation Medal, and the Humanitarian Service Medal.

References

Military personnel from Madison, Wisconsin
United States Air Force generals
Recipients of the Air Force Distinguished Service Medal
Recipients of the Legion of Merit
NASA people
University of Illinois Urbana-Champaign alumni
Oklahoma City University alumni
Cornell University alumni
Harvard University alumni
Living people
1943 births